Always Leave the Ground, also written as ...Always Leave the Ground on the album cover, is the second album released by This Day and Age on its label One Eleven Records.

Track listing
 "Sometimes" – 1:09
 "Tomorrow Is Waiting" – 3:27
 "Hourglass" – 3:27
 "Second Place Victory" – 3:54
 "Slide Show" – 3:30
 "History Is Falling for Science" – 4:00
 "The Day We Started" – 3:48
 "We Always Rewind the Best Part" – 3:27
 "I Remember Me" – 2:56
 "Seven-Eighty" – 3:24
 "Clouds & Skyscrapers" – 3:15
 "A New Focus" – 3:43
 "Long Walk Home" – 4:24

Always Leave the Ground